Hüseyin Şehitoğlu (born October 23, 1957 in Istanbul, Turkey) is a Turkish mechanical engineer who holds the John, Alice, and Sarah Nyquist Endowed Chair at the Department of Mechanical Engineering at the University of Illinois at Urbana-Champaign, United States.
Hüseyin Şehitoğlu received a B.S. in mechanical engineering from City University London, in 1979, and a M.S., and Ph.D. in theoretical and applied mechanics from the University of Illinois at Urbana-Champaign, in 1981 and 1983, respectively.

Professor Şehitoğlu served as department head of the Mechanical Engineering Department at the University of Illinois from 2004 to 2009. He was named a Grayce Wicall Gauthier Professor from 2000-2004 and then a C.J. Gauthier Professor from 2004-2008.  In 2008, Şehitoğlu was named the first ever John, Alice, and Sarah Nyquist Endowed Chair in Mechanical Science and Engineering.  In addition, Professor Şehitoğlu is a fellow of the American Society of Mechanical Engineers and was a recipient of the society's Nadai Medal in 2007.  From 2003 to 2008 Şehitoğlu was Editor of the ASME Journal of Engineering Materials and Technology. In 2012, Şehitoğlu was awarded by the University of Illinois for his excellence in graduate-level mentoring.

Notes

External links 
 Huseyin Sehitoglu University Profile

References 

"Huseyin Sehitoglu." MechSE Department. Ed. Kimberly Green. University of Illinois, n.d. Web. 07 Oct. 2012.

"Nadai Medal." ASME. Ed. John Kosowatz. American Society of Mechanical Engineers, 1 Jan. 2012. Web. 07 Oct. 2012.
 
Staub, Merideth. "Sehitoglu Receives Campus-Wide Award for Graduate Mentoring." MechSE Department. University of Illinois, 5 Mar. 2012. Web. 07 Oct. 2012.

Turkish mechanical engineers
Living people
1957 births